Werner Danckert (22 June 1900 – 5 March 1970) was a German folk song researcher.

Life 
Born in Erfurt, Danckert trained as a concert pianist after graduating from high school in 1917. He studied musicology with the subsidiary subjects philosophy and physics. In 1923 he received his doctorate in Erlangen (summa cum laude); the habilitation followed at the University of Jena in 1926.

In 1937 Danckert became a member of the NSDAP and professor at the Musikhochschule Weimar. Danckert became a member of the Hauptstelle Musik at the Amt Rosenberg. At the Reichsmusiktage in Düsseldorf (1938). Danckert gave a lecture on Volkstum, Stammesart, Rasse im Lichte der Volkstumsforschung. In 1939 he published the book Die ältesten Spuren germanischer Volksmusik.

After the end of the Second World War he did not return to any university, but published further books on folk music and other musical topics.

Danckert died in Krefeld at age 69.

Publications 
 Geschichte der Gigue, Leipzig 1924
 Ursymbole melodischer Gestaltung, Kassel 1932
 Beiträge zur Bachkritik, Kassel 1934
 Grundriss der Volksliedkunde, Berlin 1939
 Das Europäische Volkslied, Berlin 1939, dto, 2. improved and extended edition Bonn 1970 
 Claude Debussy, Berlin 1950
 Goethe, der mystische Urgrund seiner Weltschau, Berlin 1951
 Offenes und geschlossenes Leben, zwei Daseinsaspekte in Goethes Weltschau, Bonn 1963
 Unehrliche Leute. Die verfemten Berufe, Bern and Munich 1963
 Das Volkslied im Abendland, Bern and Munich 1960
 Tonreich und Symbolzahl in Hochkulturen und Primitivenwelt, Bonn 1966
 Symbol, Metapher und Allegorie im Lied der Völker, four volumes, issued from the estate of Hannelore Vogel, Bonn-Bad Godesberg 1976–78
 Musik und Weltbild,

Discontinued volumes  
 Bach und Händel
 Musik und Musikstile Polynesiens
 Studien zur Vor- und Frühgeschichte ostasiatischer Musik
 Musik im indopazifischen Raum
 Musikwissenschaft und Kulturkreislehre

References

External links 
 

20th-century German musicologists
Nazi Party members
1900 births
1970 deaths
Writers from Erfurt